The Nahant Civic Historic District consists of three civic buildings in the center of Nahant, Massachusetts.   The town hall is an H-shaped Colonial Revival structure built in 1912 to a design by the Boston firm of Andrews, Jaques & Rantoul.  The library, which stands across the street, was built in 1895 in a Jacobethan (English) Revival style, its exterior made of ashlar granite with sandstone trim.  Next to the town hall stands a small commercial block, a two-story Colonial Revival building built around the turn of the 20th century, whose tenants include the local post office.

The district was listed on the National Register of Historic Places in 1991.

See also
National Register of Historic Places listings in Essex County, Massachusetts

References

Historic districts in Essex County, Massachusetts
Nahant, Massachusetts
National Register of Historic Places in Essex County, Massachusetts
Historic districts on the National Register of Historic Places in Massachusetts